Pace Settlement is a community of the Halifax Regional Municipality in the Canadian province of Nova Scotia.

References
 Explore HRM

General Service Areas in Nova Scotia
Communities in Halifax, Nova Scotia